This battle, which took place on 16 May 1654, was the first of a series of tough battles just inside the mouth of the Dardanelles Strait, as Venice and sometimes the other Christian forces attempted to hold the Turks back from their invasion of Crete by attacking them early.

Venetian commander Giuseppe Delfino reached the mouth of the Dardanelles on 19 April after a voyage in which he lost approximately 3 ships. His fleet of 17 sailing ships, 2 galleasses and 8 galleys was not large enough or adequately prepared. Murad, the Kapudan Pasha (admiral) left Istanbul with 30 sailing ships, 6 galleasses (known in Turkey as mahons), and 40 galleys on 10 May and reached the Narrows, just above the mouth of the Dardanelles, on 15 May. His fleet was formed into 3 lines: sailing ships first, then galleasses, then galleys. The next day Delfino attacked. His plan was for his ships to remain at anchor until the Turks passed and then to attack the rear. However most Venetian ships sailed too soon, leaving Delfinos ship, San Giorgio grande, that of his second, Daniele Morosini, Aquila d'Oro, along with Orsola Bonaventura (Sebastiano Molino), Margarita, 2 galleasses and 2 galleys without support. Aquila d'Oro was attacked first, by a large Ottoman ship which she managed to capture, before 5 Turkish vessels came to its rescue. The Ottoman vessel ended up being burnt, leading to the burning of Aquila d'Oro too. Morosini was taken prisoner as he tried to flee in a boat. The action became more general, and when it was over the Venetians had lost 2 ships and 1 galley burnt, 1 galley captured, as well as the leader of the galleys, Francesco Morosini, killed, and Daniele Morosini captured. Total casualties were 30 killed and about 40 wounded, although one account had higher figures. Ottoman losses were 2 sailing ships burnt, and perhaps 1 galleass and 1 galley lost.

Order of battle

Venice (Giuseppe Delfino)
Many were hired Dutch or English ships

San Giorgio grande (flag)
Aquila d'Oro (Dutch Gouden Arend) - Burnt
Concordia (Dutch Eendracht)
Casa di Nassau (Dutch Huys van Nassau)
San Zorzi (Giorgio) piccolo (Dutch Kleene Sint Joris)
Aquila Coronato (Dutch Kronede Arend)
Orsola Bonaventura (English Ursula Bonaventure) - Burnt
Anna Bonaventura (English Anne Bonaventure)
San Michiel
Spirito Santo
Apollo
Margarita
San Giovanni
Conte Sdrin/Conte Desdrin
Genovese grande
Pinco Tremartino
2 galleasses
8 galleys - flag galley of Francesco Morosini burnt, 1 other captured

Ottomans (Kara Murat Pasha)
30 sailing ships - 2 burnt
6 galleasses - 1 sunk?
40 galleys - 1 sunk?
Reserve fleet guarding retreat of 14 sailing ships and 22 galleys

References

 

 
the Dardanelles 1654
Dardanelles 1654
History of the Dardanelles
1654 in Europe
1650s in the Ottoman Empire